Rubus defectionis, the Eclipse blackberry, is a rare North American species of flowering plant in the rose family. It grows in only a few locations in the east-central United States (Maryland and Virginia).

The epithet defectionis is from the Latin "defectio," meaning "eclipse." This is in reference to the community of Eclipse, Virginia, where the plant was first discovered.

The genetics of Rubus is extremely complex, so that it is difficult to decide on which groups should be recognized as species. There are many rare species with limited ranges such as this. Further study is suggested to clarify the taxonomy.

References

defectionis
Plants described in 1942
Flora of Maryland
Flora of Virginia